Vámospércs is a town in Hajdú-Bihar county, in the Northern Great Plain region of eastern Hungary.

Geography

International relations

Twin towns – Sister cities
Vámospércs is twinned with:

  Valea lui Mihai, Romania  
  Koronowo, Poland  
  Nușfalău, Romania

References

External links

  in Hungarian
Vámospércs - ShtetLink

Populated places in Hajdú-Bihar County